Yorketown Airport (IATA:ORR, ICAO:YYOR) is a regional, uncontrolled airport located in Yorketown on the Yorke Peninsula, South Australia. The airfield is ran and operated by the Yorke Peninsula Council.

The airfield is used as an emergency landing strip for the RFDS service, but it is also open for public use.

Facilities 
The airfield has one dirt runway with the heading of 17/35. The airfield has basic landing lights, aircraft parking, windsock, toilets and a water station. The airfield does not have avgas.

See also
List of airports in South Australia

References 

Airports in South Australia
Yorke Peninsula